Nicole C. Carroll-Lewis (born April 18, 1968, in San Francisco, California) is an American track and field athlete known for the javelin throw.  She competed for USA at the 1996 Olympics after qualifying on the last throw.  She is a two time American Champion in the event in 1996 and 1998.

Carroll went to Alameda High School, where she was merely a  shot putter and  discus thrower. She took up javelin at the College of San Mateo after encouragement from Mike Lewis, a friend of her father, a San Francisco firefighter. Lewis continued as her coach and later, her husband. She won the CCCAA Championship in 1989. She continued at Fresno State University, winning the 1990 Big West Conference Championship. After college, she threw for the Olympic Club. That mark qualified her to the 1995 World Championships.

She was inducted into the inaugural class of the College of San Mateo Athletics Hall of Fame in 2011.

References

External links
 A photographic analysis of Nicole Carroll's technique

1968 births
Living people
Athletes (track and field) at the 1996 Summer Olympics
Olympic track and field athletes of the United States
American female javelin throwers
Track and field athletes from San Francisco
21st-century American women